The IEEE David Sarnoff Award was a Technical Field Award presented in 1959–2016 by the Institute of Electrical and Electronics Engineers (IEEE). It was awarded annually for exceptional contributions to electronics.

The award was established in 1959 by the RCA Corporation; in 1989 the Sarnoff Corporation became its sponsor. It consisted of a bronze medal, certificate and honorarium, and was presented each year to an individual or small team (up to three people).

The award was discontinued in 2016.

Recipients 
Source: IEEE

See also

 List of engineering awards
 List of awards named after people

References 

David Sarnoff Award
Awards established in 1959